Richard Allen Dillin (December 17, 1928 – March 1, 1980) was an American comics artist best known for a 12-year run as the penciler of the DC Comics superhero-team series Justice League of America. He drew 115 issues from 1968 until his death in 1980.

Early life and career

Dick Dillin was born in Watertown, New York. Determined since childhood to draw for comics, Dillin graduated from Watertown High School to become an art student at Syracuse University on the G.I. Bill, following his military service with the 8th U.S. Army in Tokyo, Yokohama, and Okinawa.

Dillin eventually did art for Fawcett Comics (on features including "Lance O'Casey" and "Ibis the Invincible" in Whiz Comics) and Fiction House ("Buzz Bennett", "Space Rangers") led to drawing for Quality Comics, beginning in 1952. He worked particularly on the popular title Blackhawk but also on G.I. Combat, Love Confessions, and Love Secrets. When Quality went out of business, Dillin, searching for new work, eventually tried DC Comics where he saw one or more issues of Blackhawk on the desk as he was being interviewed, and to his relief was told, "We've been trying to get in touch with you."

DC Comics

Dillin returned to Blackhawk, now a DC property, and when the book's initial run ended, went on to draw issues of World's Finest Comics before being assigned Justice League of America, a superteam series featuring, at the time, Superman, Batman, Green Lantern, Wonder Woman, Green Arrow, and the Atom. Dillin penciled the series from #64–183 (Aug. 1968–Oct. 1980), except for the planned reprint issues #67, 76, 85 and 93; issue #153 which was pencilled by George Tuska; and issue #157 where he provided the intro and epilogue pages while Juan Ortiz pencilled the main story. He had completed the first 2½ pages of #184 when he died; penciler George Pérez and inker Frank McLaughlin took over the title, starting that issue from scratch.

Dillin's tenure on JLA included the reintroduction of Red Tornado. He and writer Dennis O'Neil made several changes to the membership of the JLA by removing founding members Wonder Woman and the Martian Manhunter. They also oversaw the migration of the Black Canary from Earth-2 to Earth-1; and the introduction of the JLA satellite.  Dillin and writer Len Wein produced the return of the Seven Soldiers of Victory in issues #100–102 and the introduction of the Quality Comics characters to the DC continuity as the Freedom Fighters in issues #107–108.

In late 1972, Dillin drew the DC chapter of a metafictional unofficial crossover crafted by writers Wein, Steve Englehart, and Gerry Conway spanning titles from both major comics companies. Each comic featured Englehart, Conway, and Wein, as well as Wein's first wife Glynis, interacting with Marvel or DC characters at the Rutland Halloween Parade in Rutland, Vermont. Beginning in Amazing Adventures #16 (by Englehart with art by Bob Brown and Frank McLaughlin), the story continued in Justice League of America #103 (by Wein, Dillin and Dick Giordano), and concluded in Thor #207 (by Conway and penciler John Buscema).

Wein and Dillin created the supervillain Libra in Justice League of America #111 (June 1974), who would play a leading role in Grant Morrison's Final Crisis storyline in 2008.  Dillin drew the return of Wonder Woman to the team in issues #128–129 (March–April 1976).  He and writer Steve Englehart crafted a new origin story for the JLA in issue #144 and inducted Hawkgirl into the team two issue later. Other highlights of Dillin's tenure included the 1976 integration of the defunct and newly acquired Fawcett Comics heroes in issues #135-137, and the murder of the original Mister Terrific in issue #171. Dillin and writer Bob Haney created the Super-Sons, Superman Jr. and Batman Jr., in World's Finest Comics #215 (Jan. 1973). He drew several Green Lantern backup stories in The Flash from 1974 to 1977. In 1975, Dillin drew the framing chapters for a 1940s Seven Soldiers of Victory script in Adventure Comics #438 and 443.

He was living in Peekskill, New York, at the time of his death. As per the letters page of Justice League of America #184, Dillin suffered a heart attack.

Animation
Dillin drew animation storyboards for the Trans-Lux/Joe Orolio syndicated TV series Johnny Zero (c. 1962), and The Mighty Hercules (1963), among other shows.

Bibliography
Comics work (interior pencil art) includes:

DC Comics

Action Comics (Green Arrow) #424, 426, 431, 434, 436; (The Atom): #425, 427, 430, 433, 435, 438–439, 448; (Private Life of Clark Kent): #477 (1973–1977)
Adventure Comics (Seven Soldiers of Victory): #438, 443 (1975–1976)
Atom and Hawkman #40–45 (1968–1969)
Batman #246 (with Irv Novick); (Robin): #252, 254 (1972–1973)
Blackhawk #108–241 (1957–1968)
Challengers of the Unknown #72 (1970)
DC Comics Presents #7, 13–14, 18, 22, 25 (1979–1980)
DC Special Series (Aquaman): #1 (1977)
DC Super-Stars #10 (1976)
Detective Comics (Batman) #433, 483; (Hawkman): #428 (1972–1978)
The Flash (Kid Flash) #202, 204, 207, 209, 211, 216 (1970–72); (Green Lantern): #227–228, 230–231, 233–234, 245–246 (1974–1977)
Green Lantern vol. 2 #67, 71 (1969)
Hawkman #22–27 (1967–1968)
House of Mystery #197 (1971)
House of Secrets #82, 84, 87–88, 92, 96 (1969–1972)
Justice League of America #64–66, 68–75, 77–84, 86–92, 94–152, 154–183 (1968–1980)
Spectre (Hourman) #7 (1968)
Superman (Terra-Man): #249; (Fabulous World of Krypton): #257, 263, 266, 268 (1972–1973)
The Unexpected #121–123, 126, 131, 133, 163, 165 (1970–1975)
The Witching Hour #26 (1972)
Wonder Woman #217 (1975)
World's Finest Comics (Superman team-ups): #198–205, 207–228, 231–233, 235–236, 238, 240, 257; (Green Arrow): #256 (1970–1979)

Quality Comics
Blackhawk #37, 40, 64–65, 67–107 (1951–1956)
Plastic Man #45 (1954)

Collected editions
 Justice League of America Archives 
 Volume 8 collects Justice League of America #64–66, 68–70   
 Volume 9 collects Justice League of America #71–80 
 Volume 10 collects Justice League of America #81–93 
 Showcase Presents Justice League of America 
 Volume 4 collects Justice League of America #64–66, 68–75, 77–83  
 Volume 5 collects Justice League of America #84, 86–92, 94–106  
 Volume 6 collects Justice League of America #107–132 
 Crisis on Multiple Earths
 Volume 2 collects Justice League of America #64–65, 73–74, and 82–83  
 Volume 3 collects Justice League of America #91–92, 100–102, 107–108, and 113 
 Volume 4 collects Justice League of America #123–124, 135–137, and 147–148 
 Volume 5 collects Justice League of America #159–160, 171–172, and 183  
 Superman/Batman: The Greatest Stories Ever Told includes World’s Finest Comics #207 
 Tales of the Batman: Len Wein includes World’s Finest Comics #207

References

External links

Dick Dillin at Mike's Amazing World of Comics

1928 births
1980 deaths
American comics artists
American storyboard artists
DC Comics people
Golden Age comics creators
People from Peekskill, New York
Silver Age comics creators
Syracuse University alumni
United States Army soldiers